is a residential district of Shibuya, Tokyo, Japan.

It is bordered by:

  and Minamidai to the north 
 Nishi-Shinjuku to the east 
 Hatagaya, to the southeast 
 Hatsudai to the south

As of October 2020, the population of this district is 27,592. The postal code for Honmachi is 151-0071.

Demography

Education

 operates public elementary and junior high schools.

All of Honmachi 2 through 4-chome and parts of 5 through 6-chome are zoned to Shibuya Honmachi Gakuen (渋谷本町学園) for elementary school.
Honmachi 1-chome is zoned to Hatashiro Elementary School (幡代小学校). Portions of Honmachi 5 and 6-chome are zoned to Nakahata Elementary School (中幡小学校).

All of Honmachi 1 through 4-chome and parts of 5 and 6-chome are zoned to Shibuya Honmachi Gakuen for junior high school. The remaining parts of 5 and 6-chome are zoned to Sasazuka Junior High School (笹塚中学校).

Transportation 
The only subway/train station in Honmachi is Hatsudai Station on the Keiō New Line, on the southern border of Honmachi near the Tokyo Opera City Tower.

The closest stations outside of Honmachi are:

 Nishi-shinjuku-gochome Station on the Toei Ōedo Line to the northeast.
 Nakano-sakaue Station (Tokyo Metro Marunouchi Line and Toei Ōedo Line) to the north.
 Hatagaya Station on the Keiō New Line to the southwest
 Nakano-shimbashi Station on the Tokyo Metro Marunouchi Line to the northwest.

Honmachi is also served by several bus lines:

 Keio Dentetsu Bus 
 Hachiko Bus (Japanese)

Honmachi public services/attractions 

 Shogonji Buddhist Temple (Japanese Wikipedia)
 Honmachi Public Library (Japanese)
 Shibuya Ward Local Office (Japanese)
 New National Theatre, Tokyo

References

Neighborhoods of Tokyo
Shibuya